The Drowning of Lucy Hamilton an album by Lydia Lunch and Lucy Hamilton. It was released in 1985 through Widowspeak. It is the soundtrack to the Richard Kern film The Right Side of My Brain.

Content 

Trouser Press wrote that the album "consists of eerie instrumentals orchestrated with piano, honking bass clarinet [...] and guitars that sound like they're being played with ice picks and hedge clippers."

Reception 

Trouser Press described it as "something rather different for Lunch, and less like background music than most soundtracks." The Rough Guide to Rock called the album "an eerie and twisted instrumental tribute to film noir."

Track listing

Personnel 
Musicians
Lucy Hamilton – guitar, bass clarinet
Lydia Lunch – guitar, piano
Production and additional personnel
Steve McAllister – engineering
Roli Mosimann – engineering
Marcia Resnick – photography
Patrick Roques – design
J.G. Thirlwell – engineering

References

External links 
 

1985 albums
Albums produced by JG Thirlwell
Lydia Lunch albums